Mount Jetté, also named Boundary Peak 177, is a mountain in Alaska and British Columbia, located on the Canada–United States border, and part of the Southern Icefield Ranges of the Saint Elias Mountains.  It is named in 1908 for Sir Louis-Amable Jetté, (1836-1920), a member of the 1903 Canadian Boundary Tribunal, leading to the resolution of the Alaska Boundary Dispute, and Lieutenant Governor of the Province of Quebec from 1898 to 1908. The peak of Mount Jetté is not far from the westernmost point in British Columbia.

See also
List of Boundary Peaks of the Alaska-British Columbia/Yukon border

References

Mountains of Alaska
Two-thousanders of British Columbia
Saint Elias Mountains
Canada–United States border
International mountains of North America
Mountains of Yakutat City and Borough, Alaska